WinZip is a trialware file archiver and compressor for Microsoft Windows, macOS, iOS and Android. It is developed by WinZip Computing (formerly Nico Mak Computing), which is owned by Corel Corporation. The program can create archives in Zip file format,  unpack some other archive file formats and it also has various tools for system integration.

Features
 Support for ARC and ARJ archives if suitable external programs are installed.

History

WinZip 1.0 was released in April 1991 as a Graphical User Interface (GUI) front-end for PKZIP.

From version 6.0 until version 9.0, registered users could download the newest versions of the software, enter their original registration information or install over the top of their existing registered version, and thereby obtain a free upgrade. This upgrade scheme was discontinued as of version 10.0.

On May 2, 2006, WinZip Computing was acquired by Corel Corporation using the proceeds from its initial public offering.

Supported .ZIP archive features
 128- and 256-bit key AES encryption in addition to the less secure PKZIP 2.0 encryption method used in earlier versions. The AES implementation, using Brian Gladman's code, was FIPS-197 certified, on March 27, 2003. However, Central Directory Encryption feature is not supported.

Release history

Windows
The ZIP file archive format (ZIP) was originally invented for MS-DOS in 1989 by Phil Katz.

Mac
WinZip 1.0 for Mac OS X (November 16, 2010): Initial release is compatible with Intel Macs and can be run on v10.5 'Leopard.'

iOS
The iOS version was first released on February 17, 2012.

Android
WinZip Android was first released on June 19, 2012.

See also
 Comparison of archive formats
 Comparison of file archivers
 List of archive formats
 
 7-Zip

References

External links
 

1991 software
2006 mergers and acquisitions
Corel software
data compression software
file archivers
proprietary software
Windows compression software